This is a list of philosophy-related events in the 16th century (16th-century philosophy).

Events

Publications 
 1501 – Nilakantha Somayaji, Tantrasamgraha
 1532 – Niccolò Machiavelli, The Prince
 1536 – John Calvin, Institutes of the Christian Religion
 1576 – Étienne de La Boétie, Discourse on Voluntary Servitude

Births 
 1528 – Pedro da Fonseca (d. 1599)
 1530 – Jean Bodin (d. 1596)
 1 November 1530 – Étienne de La Boétie (d. 1563)
 5 January 1548 – Francisco Suárez (d. 1617)
 22 January 1561 – Francis Bacon (d. 1626)
 17 January 1574 – Robert Fludd (d. 1637)
 1575 – Sabatino de Ursis (d. 1620)
 24 April 1575 – Jakob Böhme (d. 1624)
 5 April 1588 – Thomas Hobbes (d. 1679)
 9 June 1589 – John of St. Thomas (d. 1644)
 17 January 1600 – Pedro Calderón de la Barca (d. 1681)

Deaths 
 12 July 1536 – Erasmus of Rotterdam (b. 1466)
 18 August 1563 – Étienne de La Boétie (b. 1530)
 17 February 1600 – Giordano Bruno (b. 1548)

See also
List of centuries in philosophy

References 
Henrik Lagerlund and Benjamin Hill (eds). Routledge Companion to Sixteenth Century Philosophy. Routledge. 2017. Google Books 
Constance Blackwell and Sachiko Kusukawa (eds). Philosophy in the Sixteenth and Seventeenth Centuries: Conversations with Aristotle. Ashgate Publishing. 1999. Routledge. 2016. Google Books.
Richard H Popkin (ed). Philosophy of the Sixteenth and Seventeenth Centuries. The Free Press. 1966. Google Books
Henry Osborn Taylor. Philosophy and Science in the Sixteenth Century. Collier Books. 1962. (Thought and Expression in the Sixteenth Century, volume 5). Google Books
Anthony Kenny. A New History of Western Philosophy. Clarendon Press. Oxford. 2010. Part Three. Chapter 1. A New History of Western Philosophy. Clarendon Press. Oxford. 2006. Volume 3 (The Rise of Modern Philosophy). Chapter 1
Lucien Paul Victor Febvre. The Problem of Unbelief in the Sixteenth Century: The Religion of Rabelais. Harvard University Press. Cambridge, Massachusetts. London. 1982. Chapter 10. Pages 354 et seq. Translated by Beatrice Gottlieb from Le probleme de l'incroyance au XVI siecle: la religion de Rabelais, Editions Albin Michel, 1942, 1968.
"Philosophy in sixteenth-century Portugal" in "Brazil, Philosophy in". Edward Craig (ed). Routledge Encyclopedia of Philosophy. Routledge. 1998. Volume 2. Pages 7 and 8. 
Junmai Zhang. Wang Yang-ming: Idealist Philosopher of Sixteenth Century China. St. John's University Press. 1962. Google Books

Early Modern philosophy
Philosophy by century